Uchkun Kuranbaev (born 18 July 1996) is an Uzbek Paralympic judoka. He won gold in 2020 in the Men's 66 kg.

References

External links
 
 

Living people
1996 births
Place of birth missing (living people)
Uzbekistani male judoka
Paralympic judoka of Uzbekistan
Judoka at the 2020 Summer Paralympics
Medalists at the 2020 Summer Paralympics
21st-century Uzbekistani people